Badakənd ( Bada) is a village in the Shamkir Rayon of Azerbaijan.

References 

Populated places in Shamkir District